Australolinyphia is a monotypic genus of Australian dwarf spiders containing the single species, Australolinyphia remota. It was first described by J. Wunderlich in 1976, and has only been found in Australia.

See also
 List of Linyphiidae species

References

Linyphiidae
Monotypic Araneomorphae genera
Spiders of Australia